Johannes Meindert Willem Moorlach (born December 21, 1955) is an American politician who served as a member of the California State Senate representing 37th Senate district, which includes portions of Orange County, from 2015 to 2020. He was defeated for reelection by Dave Min in 2020; he lost a 2021 special election to return to the Orange County Board of Supervisors; he withdrew from the 2022 election for Orange County Auditor-Controller; and he lost the 2022 election for Mayor of Costa Mesa. A Republican, he previously served on the Orange County Board of Supervisors from December 5, 2006 to January 5, 2015 and as Orange County Treasurer-Tax Collector from March 17, 1995 to December 5, 2006.

Early life and education 
Johannes Meindert Willem Moorlach was born in Groningen, Netherlands, and came with his family to the United States when he was four years old. He grew up in Cypress, California and Buena Park, California. He earned his Bachelor of Science degree in business administration from the California State University, Long Beach in 1977.
He is a certified public accountant and certified financial planner. Before entering public office, he was vice president of accounting firm Balser, Horowitz, Frank and Wakeling, and the administrative partner of its Costa Mesa office.

Political career

Orange County Treasurer-Tax Collector (1995–2006) 
Moorlach first came to public attention by predicting the largest municipal bond portfolio loss and bankruptcy in U.S. history while campaigning for the office of Orange County Treasurer-Tax Collector against incumbent Democrat Robert Citron in 1994. Citron resigned later that year and was replaced on an interim basis by Tom Daxon. On March 17, 1995, Moorlach was appointed to fill the vacancy. In 1996 he was elected by the voters to complete the unexpired term, and re-elected in 1998 and 2002, serving nearly twelve years.

He is recognized as a leading expert on municipal bankruptcies.

Orange County Supervisor (2006–2015) 
In 2006, he opted not to run for re-election as Treasurer-Tax Collector and instead ran for Orange County Supervisor, winning 70% of the vote. Moorlach was unopposed for re-election in 2010.

While on the Board of Supervisors, he served on the Orange County Transportation Authority, OC LAFCO, CalOptima, and Southern California Regional Airport Authority boards.

He was succeeded on the board by Michelle Steel and ran in the 2021 special election to succeed her following her election to the US House. He lost to Democrat Katrina Foley.

California State Senate (2015–2020) 
In 2013, Moorlach announced his candidacy for the United States House of Representatives seat being vacated by John Campbell, but dropped out shortly before the deadline to file candidacy. The Congressional seat was won by state Senator Mimi Walters. Moorlach won the special election to succeed her in the state Senate with 50.3% of the vote, defeating state Assemblyman Donald P. Wagner, a fellow Republican who won 44.0% of the vote.

In 2019, Moorlach introduced a bill to expand Interstate 5 and State Highway 99 with two additional lanes. The proposal also included the repeal of speed limits on those two roads. The bill mandated a report be delivered by January 1, 2021, which has not occurred.

In the fall of 2020, Moorloch lost his bid for re-election to Democrat Dave Min. Moorlach later filed papers to run for his old seat on the Orange County Board of Supervisors.

Failed bids to return to office
After losing his Senate re-election bid in 2020, Moorlach made several failed attempts to return to office:
Losing a March 2021 special election for his former seat on the Orange County Board of Supervisors
Withdrawing from the March 2022 election for Orange County Auditor-Controller amid charges that he did not meet the legal qualifications to hold the office
Losing the November 2022 election for Mayor of Costa Mesa, California

Personal life 
With his wife, Trina, he has three children.

Electoral history

References

External links
Official state website
Official campaign website
Join California John M. W. Moorlach

1955 births
Dutch emigrants to the United States
Living people
People from Cypress, California
California State University, Long Beach alumni
Orange County Supervisors
Republican Party California state senators
People from Buena Park, California
People from Costa Mesa, California
People with acquired American citizenship
21st-century American politicians